Piute State Park is a Utah state park. It is located just north of Junction. This park is a primitive area; there are no facilities. Piute offers camping, swimming, boating, and fishing for rainbow, cutthroat, and brown trout.

History
Robert D. Young, who also built the nearby Otter Creek dam, built Piute Reservoir on the main fork of the Sevier River in 1908. Both the reservoir and county are named for the Native Americans who dominated this area at one time. The state legislature changed the original spelling, from Paiute (the Native American people), to Piute.

See also

 List of Utah State Parks

References

External links

 Piute State Park official site

Protected areas of Piute County, Utah
Protected areas established in 1963
State parks of Utah